Grigore Niculescu-Buzești (August 1, 1908 – October 4, 1949) was a Romanian politician who served as the Minister of Foreign Affairs of Romania.

Niculescu-Buzești was one of the founding members of Romanian National Committee (Comitetul Național Român), an organization which claimed to be a Romanian government in exile. He was also one of the participants in the plot against the Romanian Nazi-collaborating dictator Ion Antonescu organized by the King Michael of Romania. Niculescu-Buzești died on October 12, 1949 in New York City.

See also
Foreign relations of Romania

References

Romanian Ministers of Foreign Affairs
1908 births
1949 deaths
People from Sarata